Thomas Giatano Glaviano (October 26, 1923 – January 19, 2004) was an American professional baseball third baseman, who played in Major League Baseball (MLB) for the St. Louis Cardinals and Philadelphia Phillies.

Glaviano, a native of Sacramento, California, served in the United States Coast Guard during World War II. In his finest season, Glaviano batted .285, with 92 runs scored, 117 hits, 11 home runs, and 29 doubles, as the Cardinals' starting third baseman. All told, he collected 259 hits during his five-season MLB career.

External links

1923 births
2004 deaths
Baseball players from Sacramento, California
Columbus Red Birds players
Fresno Cardinals players
Houston Buffaloes players
Major League Baseball third basemen
Philadelphia Phillies players
Sacramento Solons players
St. Louis Cardinals players
San Antonio Missions players
Springfield Cardinals players
United States Coast Guard personnel of World War II
Military personnel from Sacramento, California